TND may refer to:

 TND (TV station), in Darwin, Australia
 Tertium non datur, the law of excluded middle, a law in logic
 The National Desk, an American television news program
 The Needle Drop, a YouTube channel by music critic Anthony Fantano
 Tomorrow Never Dies, 1997 James Bond film
 Tomorrow Never Dies (disambiguation), other topics referred to by this name
 Traditional Neighborhood Development, a form of development associated with New Urbanism
 TND, currency code of the Tunisian dinar
 TND, IATA code of Alberto Delgado Airport near Trinidad, Cuba
 tnd, ISO 639 code of the Angosturas Tunebo variety of the Uwa language